MassChallenge is a global, zero-equity startup accelerator, founded in Boston, Massachusetts in 2009.

MassChallenge is headquartered in Boston's Seaport District in the Innovation and Design Building, and has additional U.S. locations in Texas and Rhode Island, as well international locations in Israel, Mexico, and Switzerland.

History

MassChallenge co-founders John Harthorne and Akhil Nigam were working as strategy consultants at Bain & Company during the global financial crisis in 2008 when they developed MassChallenge. MassChallenge secured early support from successful entrepreneurs like Desh Deshpande and Joe Fallon, the public sector including Thomas Menino the then-Mayor of Boston and the Commonwealth of Massachusetts, and large organizations like The Blackstone Charitable Foundation and Microsoft. 

During its first Boston-based cohort in 2010, MassChallenge accelerated 111 startups.

Notable alumni

JoyTunes, a music app producer 
Drync, a wine mobile app for iOS platforms 
Her Campus, an online newsmagazine for college women
Global Research Innovation & Technology, manufacturer of the Leveraged Freedom Chair 
LiquiGlide, a plant-based liquid-impregnated surface coating
RallyPoint, a professional network for US military members 
Ministry of Supply, a business wear men's fashion brand
Moneythink, a non-profit organization that places college volunteers in high school classrooms to teach courses in financial literacy and entrepreneurship

References

External links
 

Non-profit organizations based in Boston
Entrepreneurship organizations
Companies based in Boston
501(c)(3) organizations
Startup accelerators